Equator was an Interdisciplinary Research Collaboration (IRC) focused on experiences integrating physical and digital interactions, spanning six years and running over into the IPerG project. The collaboration concerned the launching of a number of "experiences", which were categorized.

Collaborators 
 University of Bristol
 University of Glasgow
 Lancaster University
 University of Nottingham
 Goldsmiths College
 University of Southampton
 University of Sussex
 University College London

Experiences 
 Applied Ultrasonic Sensing
 City
 Citywide Performance
 Can You See Me Now?
 Uncle Roy All Around You
 Curious Home
 Digital Care
 Playing and Learning
 Ambient Wood
 Domestic Environment
 Environmental E-Science
 Seamful Games
 Seamful Games 2
 Shakra
 Sharing Awareness
 Public Performance

See also 
 Pervasive games

References

External links
The Mixed Reality Lab - The Mixed Reality Laboratory at the University of Nottingham.

Research projects
Research institutes in the United Kingdom